Mjölby AI FF is a Swedish football club located in Mjölby.

Background
Mjölby AI FF currently plays in Division 4 Östergötland Västra which is the sixth tier of Swedish football. They play their home matches at the Vifolkavallen in Mjölby.

The club are affiliated to Östergötlands Fotbollförbund. Mjölby AI FF played in the 2009 Svenska Cupen but lost 2–4 at home to Vetlanda FF in the preliminary round.

Season to season

In their most successful period Mjölby AIF competed in the following divisions:

In recent seasons Mjölby AI FF have competed in the following divisions:

Footnotes

External links
 Mjölby AI FF – Official website

Football clubs in Östergötland County
Association football clubs established in 1912
1912 establishments in Sweden